Santiago Mederos Iglesias (September 8, 1944 – December 15, 1979) was a baseball player in the Cuban National League during the 1960s and 1970s. He played for Industriales, La Habana, Occidentales, Agricultores and Selección.

Career
He spent 15 years in the league, going 123-67 with a 1.97 ERA. He set and tied numerous league records during his career, including shutouts in a season (eight in 1967-1968, tied with Carlos Gálvez). In 1968-1969, he led the league with 208 strikeouts, setting a new record. He also set the single-game record for strikeouts with 20. Following the 1968-1969 season, he was named the Serie Nacional Most Valuable Pitcher. His two strikeout records have been broken, his shutout record has been tied, but not broken.

He also pitched for Cuba's national team in multiple tournaments. He worked for the team in the 1970 Central American and Caribbean Games, in which Cuba won gold; the 1970 Amateur World Series, in which Cuba took gold; the 1971 Amateur World Series, in which Cuba took gold; the 1972 Amateur World Series, in which Cuba took gold; the 1975 Pan American Games, in which Cuba took gold; the 1976 Amateur World Series, in which Cuba took gold and the 1978 Central American and Caribbean Games, in which Cuba took gold.

Death
He died in a car accident in 1979.

References

A History of Cuban Baseball, 1864-2006 by Peter C. Bjarkman

1944 births
1979 deaths
Cuban baseball players
Road incident deaths in Cuba
Baseball players at the 1975 Pan American Games
Pan American Games gold medalists for Cuba
Pan American Games medalists in baseball
Central American and Caribbean Games gold medalists for Cuba
Competitors at the 1970 Central American and Caribbean Games
Competitors at the 1978 Central American and Caribbean Games
Central American and Caribbean Games medalists in baseball
Medalists at the 1975 Pan American Games